This is a list of Superfund sites in Ohio designated under the Comprehensive Environmental Response, Compensation, and Liability Act (CERCLA) environmental law.  The CERCLA federal law of 1980 authorized the United States Environmental Protection Agency (EPA) to create a list of polluted locations requiring a long-term response to clean up hazardous material contaminations.  These locations are known as Superfund sites, and are placed on the National Priorities List (NPL).

The NPL guides the EPA in "determining which sites warrant further investigation" for environmental remediation.  As of November 29, 2010, there were 34 Superfund sites on the National Priorities List in Ohio.  Eight additional sites are currently proposed for entry on the list.  Seven sites have been cleaned up and removed from the list.

Superfund sites

Superfund Alternative sites
Superfund Alternative sites are locations that have been found to be polluted enough to be listed on the National Priorities List, but are cleaned up through other methods without formal listing.  These are not "Superfund" sites since they do not go through the Superfund listing process.

See also
List of Superfund sites in the United States
List of environmental issues
List of waste types
TOXMAP

References

External links
EPA (region 5) list of Superfund sites in Ohio
EPA list of proposed Superfund sites in Ohio
EPA list of current Superfund sites in Ohio
EPA list of Superfund site construction completions in Ohio
EPA list of partially deleted Superfund sites in Ohio
EPA list of deleted Superfund sites in Ohio

Ohio
Superfund